Point de mire was a popular Quebec information show on  Radio-Canada that aired from 1956 to 1959. The television show is famous for being hosted by a future cabinet minister and Premier of Quebec, René Lévesque.

A trademark of the show was the pedagogy of Lévesque, explaining with a chalkboard and clarifying world events to his viewers. This same technique developed at Point de mire he would later use often on television, or in person, to explain political plans and convictions, ranging from the nationalization of electricity during the Quiet Revolution to Quebec independence.

See also
List of Quebec television series
Television of Quebec
Culture of Quebec

Television shows filmed in Quebec
1950s Canadian television news shows
Ici Radio-Canada Télé original programming
1956 Canadian television series debuts
1959 Canadian television series endings
Black-and-white Canadian television shows
CBC News
René Lévesque